Spindrift is an American soda and seltzer company. Spindrift uses fruit juice to flavor its products.

Background
The company was founded in 2010 by Bill Creelman, who said he named it Spindrift after the term for the whitewash of a wave, or windblown surf, which he learned about when working on a fishing boat near Nantucket.

Spindrift is currently available in eight flavors: grapefruit, lemon, raspberry lime, orange mango, strawberry, lime, pineapple, and half and half (half lemon, half tea) and three seasonal flavors: lemon limeade, strawberry lemonade, pink lemonade.

History 

On June 4, 2014, Spindrift expanded its company's staff from four to eight people. On May 3, 2017, Spindrift closed on $10 million of new growth capital led by VMG Partners. On February 28, 2018, Spindrift announced new distribution of its products in Kroger, Starbucks, and Whole Foods. On March 20, 2018, Spindrift secured $20 million in funding from VMG Partners. On June 14, 2018, Spindrift reported experiencing a 800% sales increase from 2016 to 2018. During March 2020, Spindrift raised $29.8 million in funding from Moelis & Company LLC. As of November 2020, Spindrift has 105 employees and $69.9 million in total funding.

References

External links 

 Official Company Website

Food and drink companies established in 2010
American companies established in 2010
Drink companies of the United States
2010 establishments in Massachusetts
Companies based in Waltham, Massachusetts